José Isidro Guerrero Macías (31 May 1951 – 22 February 2022) was a Mexican Roman Catholic prelate.

Biography
Guerrero Macías was born in Mexico and was ordained to the priesthood in 1973. He served as bishop of the Roman Catholic Diocese of Mexicali, Mexico, from 1997 until his death. Macías died from COVID-19 at age 70 in Mexicali on 22 February 2022, during the COVID-19 pandemic in Mexico.

References

1951 births
2022 deaths
20th-century Roman Catholic bishops in Mexico
21st-century Roman Catholic bishops in Mexico
Bishops appointed by Pope John Paul II
Pontifical Lateran University alumni
People from Mexicali Municipality
Deaths from the COVID-19 pandemic in Mexico